Mihran is Iranian given name, also used in Armenian. Notable people with the name include:

 House of Mihran, leading Iranian noble family
 Mihranids, Iranian family which ruled several regions of Caucasus from 330 to 821

 Mihran Razi
 Mihran Apikyan
 Mihran Azaryan
 Mihran Jaburyan
 Mihran Hakobyan
 Mihran Damadian
 Mihran Kassabian
 Mihran Tsarukyan
 Mihran Poghosyan
 Mihran Mesrobian
 Mihran Harutyunyan
 Mihran-i Hamadani
 Mihran Bahram-i Chobin

 Shapur Mihran
 Golon Mihran
 Raham Mihran

 Mihran Mesrobian House
 Mihran Halt railway station

See also
 Mihrani
 Mihranabad
 Mihransitad
 Andranik Mihranyan

Armenian given names
Iranian given names